Emergency 5 is the fifth game and the final installment in the Emergency series, published in 2014 for Windows and macOS.

Reception
The reception of Emergency 5 was mixed. On Metacritic it has a score of 53 out of 100 based on reviews from 6 critics.
 PC Games December 21, 2014 – 60% ″A game as an emergency.″
 Gamestar December 5, 2014 - 67% ″More fun than any Emergency before, but with blunders.″
 Games.cz February 2, 2015 - 70% ″Emergency 5 is definitely not for everyone, but if you like real-time strategy and you prefer unconventional content, it is a game for you.″
 4Players December 3, 2014 - 39% ″Short-term entertaining, but unfinished rescue strategy that suffers from its mistakes.″
 Gamecontrast.de December 21, 2014 - 73% "After Emergency 5 had to fight many problems at its release, the title finally exploits its potential."

References

2014 video games
MacOS games
Medical video games
Tactical role-playing video games
Video games about firefighting
Video games about police officers
Video games developed in Germany
Windows games